Jazz Has a Sense of Humor is the final studio album by jazz pianist Horace Silver, released on the Verve label in 1998, featuring performances by Silver with Ryan Kisor, Jimmy Greene, John Webber, and Willie Jones III.

Reception
The Allmusic review by Michael G. Nastos awarded the album 4 stars and states: "In this set of nine originals, the Horace Silver touch is clearly evident: happy, strong melodies; groovin' beats; Silver's deft, deliberate, bluesy piano comping and boppin' leads... his tunefully familiar, head-noddin' original funk is a vital as ever, and sounds pretty fresh compared to some of the trite neo-bop being reprocessed this past decade. Silver's light, spare, soulful style is a sound for sore ears, one that has a universal, timeless appeal, crossing generational and commercial barriers. This is well-played music, a specialty Silver has envisioned and realized through the bulk of his career. Highly recommended."

Track listing
All compositions by Horace Silver
 "Satisfaction Guaranteed" – 5:47
 "The Mama Suite Part 1: Not Enough Mama" – 5:36
 "The Mama Suite Part 2: Too Much Mama" – 4:52
 "The Mama Suite Part 3: Just Right Mama" – 4:07
 "Philley Millie" – 4:45
 "Ah-Ma-Tell" – 6:00
 "I Love Annie's Fanny" – 4:48
 "Gloria" – 7:34
 "Where Do I Go from Here?" – 4:01

Personnel 
 Horace Silver – piano
Ryan Kisor – trumpet
Jimmy Greene – tenor saxophone, soprano saxophone
John Webber – bass
Willie Jones III – drums

References 

Horace Silver albums
1999 albums
Verve Records albums